The Kessler syndrome (also called the Kessler effect, collisional cascading, or ablation cascade), proposed by NASA scientist Donald J. Kessler in 1978, is a scenario in which the density of objects in low Earth orbit (LEO) due to space pollution is high enough that collisions between objects could cause a cascade in which each collision generates space debris that increases the likelihood of further collisions. In 2009 Kessler wrote that modeling results had concluded that the debris environment was already unstable, "such that any attempt to achieve a growth-free small debris environment by eliminating sources of past debris will likely fail because fragments from future collisions will be generated faster than atmospheric drag will remove them". One implication is that the distribution of debris in orbit could render space activities and the use of satellites in specific orbital ranges difficult for many generations.

History

NORAD, Gabbard and Kessler 

Willy Ley predicted in 1960 that "In time, a number of such accidentally too-lucky shots will accumulate in space and will have to be removed when the era of manned space flight arrives". After the launch of Sputnik 1 in 1957, the North American Aerospace Defense Command (NORAD) began compiling a database (the Space Object Catalog) of all known rocket launches and objects reaching orbit: satellites, protective shields and upper- and lower-stage booster rockets. NASA later published modified versions of the database in two-line element set, and during the early 1980s the CelesTrak bulletin board system re-published them.

The trackers who fed the database were aware of other objects in orbit, many of which were the result of in-orbit explosions. Some were deliberately caused during the 1960s anti-satellite weapon (ASAT) testing, and others were the result of rocket stages blowing up in orbit as leftover propellant expanded and ruptured their tanks. To improve tracking, NORAD employee John Gabbard kept a separate database. Studying the explosions, Gabbard developed a technique for predicting the orbital paths of their products, and Gabbard diagrams (or plots) are now widely used. These studies were used to improve the modeling of orbital evolution and decay.

When the NORAD database became publicly available during the 1970s, NASA scientist Donald J. Kessler applied the technique developed for the asteroid-belt study to the database of known objects. In June 1978, Kessler and Burton Cour-Palais co-authored "Collision Frequency of Artificial Satellites: The Creation of a Debris Belt", demonstrating that the process controlling asteroid evolution would cause a similar collision process in LEO in decades rather than billions of years. They concluded that by about 2000, space debris would outpace micrometeoroids as the primary ablative risk to orbiting spacecraft.

At the time, it was widely thought that drag from the upper atmosphere would de-orbit debris faster than it was created. However, Gabbard was aware that the number and type of objects in space were under-represented in the NORAD data and was familiar with its behavior. In an interview shortly after the publication of the 1978 paper, Gabbard coined the term Kessler syndrome to refer to the accumulation of debris; it became widely used after its appearance in a 1982 Popular Science article, which won the Aviation-Space Writers Association 1982 National Journalism Award.

Follow-up studies 

The lack of hard data about space debris prompted a series of studies to better characterize the LEO environment. In October 1979, NASA provided Kessler with funding for further studies. Several approaches were used by these studies.

Optical telescopes and short-wavelength radar were used to measure the number and size of space objects, and these measurements demonstrated that the published population count was at least 50% too low. Before this, it was believed that the NORAD database accounted for the majority of large objects in orbit. Some objects (typically, US military spacecraft) were found to be omitted from the NORAD list, and others were not included because they were considered unimportant. The list could not easily account for objects under  in size—in particular, debris from exploding rocket stages and several 1960s anti-satellite tests.

Returned spacecraft were microscopically examined for small impacts, and sections of Skylab and the Apollo Command/Service Module which were recovered were found to be pitted. Each study indicated that the debris flux was higher than expected and debris was the primary source of micrometeoroids and orbital debris collisions in space. LEO already demonstrated the Kessler syndrome.

In 1978, Kessler found that 42 percent of cataloged debris was the result of 19 events, primarily explosions of spent rocket stages (especially US Delta rockets). He discovered this by first identifying those launches that were described as having a large number of objects associated with a payload, then researching the literature to determine the rockets used in the launch.  In 1979, this finding resulted in establishment of the NASA Orbital Debris Program after a briefing to NASA senior management, overturning the previously held belief that most unknown debris was from old ASAT tests, not from US upper stage rocket explosions that could seemingly be easily managed by depleting the unused fuel from the upper stage Delta rocket following the payload injection.  Beginning in 1986, when it was discovered that other international agencies were possibly experiencing the same type of problem, NASA expanded its program to include international agencies, the first being the European Space Agency. A number of other Delta components in orbit (Delta was a workhorse of the US space program) had not yet exploded.

A new Kessler syndrome 
During the 1980s, the United States Air Force (USAF) conducted an experimental program to determine what would happen if debris collided with satellites or other debris. The study demonstrated that the process differed from micrometeoroid collisions, with large chunks of debris created which would become collision threats.

In 1991, Kessler published "Collisional cascading: The limits of population growth in low Earth orbit" with the best data then available. This mass could destroy a spacecraft on impact, creating more debris in the critical-mass area. According to the National Academy of Sciences:

A 1 kg object impacting at 10 km/s, for example, is probably capable of catastrophically breaking up a 1,000 kg spacecraft if it strikes a high-density element in the spacecraft. In such a breakup, numerous fragments larger than 1 kg would be created.

Kessler's analysis divided the problem into three parts. With a low-enough density, the addition of debris by impacts is slower than their decay rate and the problem is not significant. Beyond that is a critical density, where additional debris leads to additional collisions. At densities beyond this critical mass production exceeds decay, leading to a cascading chain reaction reducing the orbiting population to small objects (several centimeters in size) and increasing the hazard of space activity. This chain reaction is known as the Kessler syndrome.

In an early 2009 historical overview, Kessler summed up the situation:

Aggressive space activities without adequate safeguards could significantly shorten the time between collisions and produce an intolerable hazard to future spacecraft. Some of the most environmentally dangerous activities in space include large constellations such as those initially proposed by the Strategic Defense Initiative in the mid-1980s, large structures such as those considered in the late-1970s for building solar power stations in Earth orbit, and anti-satellite warfare using systems tested by the USSR, the US, and China over the past 30 years. Such aggressive activities could set up a situation where a single satellite failure could lead to cascading failures of many satellites in a period much shorter than years.

Anti-satellite missile tests

In 1985, the first anti-satellite (ASAT) missile was used in the destruction of a satellite. The American 1985 ASM-135 ASAT test was carried out, in which the Solwind P78-1 satellite flying at an altitude of 555 kilometres was struck by the 14-kilogram payload at a velocity of 24,000 kilometres per hour (15,000 mph; 6.7 km/s). When NASA learned of U.S. Air Force plans for the Solwind ASAT test, they modeled the effects of the test and determined that debris produced by the collision would still be in orbit late into the 1990s. It would force NASA to enhance debris shielding for its planned space station.

On 11 January 2007, China conducted an anti-satellite missile test in which one of their FY-1C weather satellites was chosen as the target. The collision occurred at an altitude of 865 kilometres, when the satellite with a mass of 750 kilograms was struck in a head-on-collision by a kinetic payload traveling with a speed of 8 km/s (18,000 mph) in the opposite direction. The resulting debris orbits the Earth with a mean altitude above 850 kilometres, and will likely remain in orbit for decades or centuries.

The destruction of the Kosmos 1408 satellite by a Russian ASAT missile on November 15, 2021, has created a large debris cloud, with 1500 pieces of debris being tracked and an estimated hundreds of thousands of pieces too small to track. Since the satellite was in a polar orbit, and its debris has spread out between the altitudes of 300 km and 1000 km, it could potentially collide with any LEO satellite, including the International Space Station and the Chinese Space Station (Tiangong).

Debris generation and destruction 

Every satellite, space probe, and crewed mission has the potential to produce space debris. The theoretical cascading Kessler syndrome becomes more likely as satellites in orbit increase in number. As of 2014, there were about 2,000 commercial and government satellites orbiting the earth, and  more than 4000. On average one satellite is destroyed by collision with space junk each year.  there had been four collisions between catalogued objects, including a collision between two satellites in 2009.

Orbital decay is much slower at altitudes where atmospheric drag is insignificant. Slight atmospheric drag, lunar perturbation, and solar wind drag can gradually bring debris down to lower altitudes where fragments finally re-enter, but this process can take millennia at very high altitudes.

Implications

The Kessler syndrome is troublesome because of the domino effect and feedback runaway wherein impacts between objects of sizable mass spall off debris from the force of the collision. The fragments can then hit other objects, producing even more space debris: if a large enough collision or explosion were to occur, such as between a space station and a defunct satellite, or as the result of hostile actions in space, then the resulting debris cascade could make prospects for long-term viability of satellites in particular low Earth orbits extremely low. However, even a catastrophic Kessler scenario at LEO would pose minimal risk for launches continuing past LEO, or satellites travelling at medium Earth orbit (MEO) or geosynchronous orbit (GEO). The catastrophic scenarios predict an increase in the number of collisions per year, as opposed to a physically impassable barrier to space exploration that occurs in higher orbits.

Avoidance and reduction
Designers of a new vehicle or satellite are frequently required by the ITU to demonstrate that it can be safely disposed of at the end of its life, for example by use of a controlled atmospheric reentry system or a boost into a graveyard orbit. For US launches or satellites that will have broadcast to US territories—in order to obtain a license to provide telecommunications services in the United States—the Federal Communications Commission (FCC) required all geostationary satellites launched after 18 March 2002 to commit to moving to a graveyard orbit at the end of their operational life. US government regulations similarly require a plan to dispose of satellites after the end of their mission: atmospheric re-entry, movement to a storage orbit, or direct retrieval.

A proposed energy-efficient means of deorbiting a spacecraft from MEO is to shift it to an orbit in an unstable resonance with the Sun or Moon that speeds up orbital decay.

Potential triggers
Don Kessler predicted in 2012 that it could easily become a major debris contributor from a collision during the next 150 years that it will remain in orbit.

SpaceX's Starlink program raises concern among many experts about significantly worsening the possibility of Kessler Syndrome due to the large number of satellites the program aims to place in LEO, as the program's goal will more than double the satellites currently in LEO.

In fiction

 The 2013 film Gravity features a Kessler syndrome catastrophe as the inciting incident of the story, when Russia shoots down an old satellite.
 Neal Stephenson's 2015 novel Seveneves begins with the unexplained explosion of the Moon into seven large pieces, the subsequent creation of a cloud of debris by Kessler syndrome collisions, and the eventual bombardment of Earth's surface by lunar meteoroids.

See also

 1961 and 1963 
 1985 ASM-135 ASAT test – 1985 United States anti-satellite missile test
 
 
  anti-satellite missile test

Citations

Bibliography 

 .
 
 .
 .
 .
 .
 .
 .
 .

Further reading
 
 An article in the July 2009 issue of Popular Mechanics by Glenn Harlan Reynolds discusses the Kessler syndrome in regards to the February 2009 satellite collision and how international law may need to address the problem to help prevent future incidents: Reynolds, G. H. (2009, July). "Collision course". Popular Mechanics, pp. 50–52.
 Documentary: Collision point: The Race to Clean Up Space (length: 22 minutes 28 seconds), included in the extra material on the Blu-ray Disc for the film Gravity.

External links
 Donald Kessler's Web Page at uwo.ca
 Orbiting Satellites in real time  at stuffin.space
 
 Mathematical Modeling of debris flux  at lasp.colorado.edu
 
 
 
 
 Aggregated public information research on space debris, graveyard orbits, etc.
 
 "How space debris threatens modern life". Financial Times. 8 June 2022.

Meteorological hypotheses
Pollution
Space hazards
Space warfare
1978 neologisms